Siril Malmedal Hauge (born 1992 in Langevåg) is a Norwegian jazz singer and songwriter residing in Oslo, Norway.

Biography 
Siril Malmedal Hauge is a vocalist educated on the jazz program at Norwegian University of Science and Technology in Trondheim. In addition to heading projects like «Fieldfare» and «Wild Things Run Fast», she has collaborated with bands and musicians like Lars Jansson, Jesper Bodilsen, Anders Thorén, Jacob Young, Magnus Bakken, Henrik Lødøen, Alf Hulbækmo, Ytre Suløens Jazz Ensemble, MMO-ensemble, Martin Myhre Olsen the vocal ensemble Sonavi, and the Prøysen-project «Lillebror» (Little Brother) releasing their debut album on the Grappa label. In 2010 she received the Norwegian Cultural Education Council «Drømmestipendet (Dream scholarship)» and in 2011 Cultural grants from Sula Municipality. She has also played and toured in Norway, Sweden, Belgium, Germany, Estonia and Serbia.

In 2016 she released the album Jeg Går og Drømmer along with the pianist Alf Hulbækmo at Atlethic Sound Records. And releases the album  Fieldfare  in February 2017 on the label Øra Fonogram. She also contributes to the project Nordic Circles, releasing the album Under The Clouds (2017) on AMP music & records.

Discography

Albums 
2016: Siril & Alf - "Jeg Går og Drømmer" (Atlethic Sound Records)
2017: Lillebror - "Lillebror" (Grappa Musikk)
2018: Siril Malmedal Hauge/Jacob Young - "Last Things" (Oslo Session Recordings)
2019: "Uncharted Territory" (Jazzland Recordings)
2021: Siril Malmedal Hauge/Jacob Young - "Chasing Sunsets" (Oslo Session Recordings)
2021: "Slowly, slowly" (Jazzland Recordings)

Collaborations 

2017: Nordic Cirkles II - "Under The Clouds" (AMP Musikk & Records)

2017: Fieldfare - "Fieldfare" (Øra Fonogram)

2016: Sugarfoot -"Different Stars" (Crispin Clover Records)

2013: LP "Wave" - Out Of His Hands, (Kakao Musikk)

References

External links 
 Siril Malmedal Hauge & Jacob Young - Little Wing at YouTube

Norwegian women jazz singers
Norwegian jazz singers
Norwegian jazz composers
Musicians from Langevåg
Musicians from Lillehammer
21st-century Norwegian singers
Norwegian University of Science and Technology alumni
Living people
1992 births
21st-century Norwegian women singers
Grappa Music artists
Jazzland Recordings (1997) artists